Nixon Smiley (August 17, 1911 – 1990) was a reporter, columnist, and feature writer for the Miami Herald as well as an author of numerous books.

Smiley was born in Orange Park, Florida and was raised by his maternal grandparent after losing both parents by the age of 7.

His career in newspapers began at the Florida Times Union in Jacksonville. He was in the U.S. Marine Corps during World War II. Upon his return he began a 30 plus year career at the Herald and authorship of 15 books.

He worked at the Herald from 1940 until 1973. The Nixon Smiley Research Papers (1940s-1972) are held at the Historical Museum of Southern Florida.

His wife Evelyn was an artist, and Smiley was a devoted gardener who volunteered at the Fairchild Tropical Botanic Garden, where a Nixon Smiley collection recording his records as Interim Director from 1953 to 1961 (4,000 pages) is kept as well as papers covering his field trips. There is a Nixon Smiley Pineland Preserve.

Smiley authored:

 Knights of the Fourth Estate: The Story of the Miami Herald June 1984
 Crowder Tales June 1973
 The Miami Herald Front Pages, 1903-1983 by Nixon Smiley (Hardcover - Jan 1, 1983)
 On the Beat and Offbeat June 1983
 Florida, Land of Images April 1977
 Yesterday's Miami June 1977
 Lady by Onie (as told to Nixon Smiley) Craig 1976
 Yesterday's Florida (Seemann's historic States series) June 1974
 Isabel as told to Nixon Smiley by Isabel J. Foster 1975
 Tropical Planting and Gardening for South Florida and the West Indies June 1960
 Florida Gardening month by month 1957, 1971
 Florida Gardening 1958
 Subtropical gardening in Florida 1951

References

1911 births
1990 deaths
American male journalists
20th-century American journalists
Miami Herald people
20th-century American non-fiction writers
People from Orange Park, Florida
20th-century American male writers